Here Come the Girls was a short-lived Australian television variety series which aired in early 1960 on ABC station ABV-2. Hosted by Ruth Nye, the cast of the first episode of the weekly series included vocalist Paula Langlands, soprano Madge Stephens, and pianists Joy Mitchell and Wendy Pomroy. As the title suggests, the main focus of the series was female performers. There is no information available as to whether any of the episodes are still extant.

Reception
Reviewing the first episode, The Age considered the series to be "a big disappointment". The writer for the newspaper said that Wendy Pomroy's piano item was entertaining, but that  "Elsewhere was chaos for a channel which has a record for the presentation of above-average variety of the more dignified type" and stated the second episode showed no improvement.

References

External links
Here Come the Girls on IMDb

1960 Australian television series debuts
1960 Australian television series endings
Australian Broadcasting Corporation original programming
Black-and-white Australian television shows
English-language television shows
Australian variety television shows
Australian live television series